El Siglo is a Chilean weekly newspaper, that is the official organ of the Central Committee of the Chilean Communist Party. The newspaper was founded on August 31, 1940.

On July 14, 1948 it was closed down as consequence of the anti-communist Defense of Democracy Law. From September 10, 1949 it was published clandestinely. On October 25, 1952 it was once again openly published. After the Chilean coup of 1973, it was once again closed down, although it was published clandestinely under Augusto Pinochet.  In 1989 it became a weekly magazine.

References

External links  
Official Page

1940 establishments in Chile
Magazines published in Chile
Communist magazines
Magazines established in 1989
Mass media in Santiago
News magazines published in South America
Newspapers published in Chile
Newspapers established in 1940
Spanish-language communist newspapers
Spanish-language magazines
Weekly news magazines